A road is a thoroughfare, route, or way on land between two places that has been surfaced or otherwise improved to allow travel by foot or some form of conveyance, including a motor vehicle, cart, bicycle, or horse. Roads have been adapted to a large range of structures and types in order to achieve a common goal of transportation under a large and wide range of conditions. The specific purpose, mode of transport, material and location of a road determine the characteristics it must have in order to maximize its usefulness. Following is one classification scheme.

Taxonomy of road 
Marohn distinguishes between roads that are designed for mobility which he terms "roads" and those that are function to "build a place", build community wealth and provide access to land. He argues the value of a road in terms of both community wealth and mobility is maximised when the road speed is either low or high, but not at midpoints such as 45mph. He refers to this low-value midpoint of speed and land access as a stroad.

Types of roads

Lower capacity roads

Street

Primitive roads

Agricultural road
Backroad
Dirt road
Forest road
Gravel road
Green lane
Historic roads and trails
Ice road
Roman roads
Sunken lane

Large roads

Private roads

Driveway
Gated community
Military road
Private highway
Private road

Intersecting roads

Connector
Interchange
Intersection
Level junction
Level crossing
Road diet
Roundabout

Material type 
Roads also may be classified based on their pavement material types. For instance, the Long-Term Pavement Performance database includes more than 30 types of pavement types for roads in the US and Canada. However, a more generic classification of roads based on material type is as follows.

 Concrete roads
 Asphalt roads
 Gravel roads
 Earthen roads
 Murrum roads
 Kankar roads
 Bituminous roads

Other thoroughfares

References

External links

Types of roads
Roads
Roads
Roads